Richard D'Alton Williams (8 October 1822 – 5 July 1862) was an Irish physician and poet, "Shamrock" of the Nation.

Life
He was born in Dublin, son of James and Mary Williams, who came from Westmeath. He grew up in Grenanstown, a townland near the Devil's Bit in County Tipperary, where his father farmed for Count Dalton. He was educated at Tullabeg Jesuit College and St. Patrick's College, Carlow.

He started contributing verses to the Nation in 1843. He was immediately successful; in the edition of 21 January 1843 there appeared: "Shamrock is a jewel. He cannot write too often. His verses are full of vigour, and as natural as the harp of Tara".

Later in 1843 he came to Dublin to study medicine.  In 1848, with Thomas Antisell and Kevin O'Doherty, he brought out a newspaper, The Irish Tribune, to take the place of the suppressed United Irishman, founded by John Mitchel. Before the sixth weekly publication, it was seized by the Government, and proceedings were instituted against the editors. On 30 October 1848, at a third trial, O'Doherty was convicted and transported to Australia; Antisell fled to the US, arriving in November. Williams, tried two days after O'Doherty, was acquitted. He resumed his medical studies, took out his degree at Edinburgh in 1849 and emigrated to America in 1851.

In the USA he practised medicine until he became ill and died of tuberculosis in Thibodaux, Louisiana in 1862. He is buried there in St. Joseph's Cemetery.  His headstone was later erected that year by Irish members of the 8th New Hampshire Volunteer Infantry, then encamped in Thibodaux.

He was married to Elizabeth Connolly, with whom he had two children.

Bibliography
The Poems of Richard D'Alton Williams, edited with biographical introduction by P. A. Sillard, Third Edition, Dublin, 1901

References
 

1822 births
1862 deaths
19th-century Irish medical doctors
People from County Dublin
Irish emigrants to the United States (before 1923)
Alumni of Carlow College
Alumni of the University of Edinburgh
19th-century Irish poets
People educated at St Stanislaus College